Robert Woodrow Levering (October 3, 1914 – August 11, 1989) was a U.S. Representative from Ohio, son-in-law of Usher L. Burdick and brother-in-law of Quentin N. Burdick.

Biography
Born near Fredericktown, Ohio was son of Gertrude Alice and Daniel Lloyd Levering, Levering graduated from Fredericktown High School. He earned his Bachelor of Arts in 1936 from Denison University, Granville, Ohio, and his Bachelor of Laws in 1940 from George Washington University Law School, Washington, D.C.  He was a librarian at the Library of Congress from 1937 to 1941, and was a lawyer in private practice.

Levering was in the United States Army Reserve. As a civilian attorney working for the United States War Department in Manila, Philippines, he became a prisoner of war during World War II from 1942 to 1945. He served as assistant attorney general of Ohio from 1949 to 1950. He was an unsuccessful Democratic candidate for election to Congress in 1948, 1950, 1954, and 1956.

Levering was elected as a Democrat to the Eighty-sixth Congress (January 3, 1959 – January 3, 1961).  He was an unsuccessful candidate for reelection to the Eighty-seventh Congress in 1960 and for election in 1962. He died on August 11, 1989, in Fredericktown, Ohio, and his remains were cremated.

Publications

References

 Retrieved on 2010-01-04

1914 births
1989 deaths
American people of World War II
Librarians at the Library of Congress
Ohio lawyers
Bataan Death March prisoners
People from Fredericktown, Ohio
Military personnel from Ohio
Denison University alumni
George Washington University Law School alumni
Burdick family
20th-century American politicians
Democratic Party members of the United States House of Representatives from Ohio
United States Army personnel
United States Army reservists
World War II civilian prisoners held by Japan